Raising Duncan was a partly autobiographical, syndicated gag-a-day comic strip by Chris Browne. It ran from 2000 until 2005.

The story followed the lives of 'Big Daddy' and his wife Adelle. They were both novelists. Adelle, the more successful of the two,  was an award-winning mystery writer. Big Daddy wrote romantic novels. They had two pets: Duncan, a black Scottie dog, after whom the strip was named, and a cat called Brambley.

References

External links 
 Raising Duncan at GoComics

American comic strips
Gag-a-day comics
Comics about married people
Comics set in the United States
2000 comics debuts
2005 comics endings